Wade F. Horn is an American psychologist. He received his PHD from the Southern Illinois University in 1981. He has served as President George W. Bush's Assistant Secretary for Children and Families from 2001 to 2007. Before his resignation on April 1, 2007, he oversaw the function of the Administration For Children and Families, an agency within the United States Department of Health and Human Services. He also served under President George H. W. Bush as Commissioner of Children, Youth, and Families within the Administration For Children and Families.

Horn is an advocate for the re-envisioning and revising of the Federal Head Start program. Horn served as president of the National Fatherhood Initiative. He served as an assistant professor of psychology at Michigan State University and was an affiliate scholar at the right-wing think tank, the Hudson Institute.

Tenure 

Horn has been a supporter and participant in the Coalition for Marriage, Family, and Couples Education, an educational organization concerning family life.

Criticism 
Horn has been criticized by Planned Parenthood and other sexual health education organizations for his advocacy of abstinence programs. During his term with Health and Humans Services, he oversaw increases in funding for both abstinence education  and relationship education. Under Horn's administration, these programs are believed to have contained misrepresentations regarding contraceptives, HIV and pregnancy.

References

Sources
US Department of Health & Human Service.

External links

let's get married

21st-century American psychologists
Southern Illinois University alumni
Michigan State University faculty
Living people
Year of birth missing (living people)